The 2021 Nationale 1 season was the season of the Nationale 1, the premier basketball league in Senegal. The champions directly qualify for the 2022 Basketball Africa League season.

DUC Dakar won its fifth national championship after defeating defending champions AS Douanes in the final. Thierno Niang was named the league's Finals MVP.

Teams
Tamba and HLM were relegated after finishing in the last two places in the 2019 Nationale 1 season. Bopp and ISEG Sports were promoted.

Regular season

Group A

Group B

Championship playoffs

Semifinals
AS Douanes vs ASC Ville de Dakar

DUC Dakar vs SLBC

Final

References

2021
Senegal